The Central District of Tarom County is in Zanjan province, Iran. At the National Census in 2006, its population was 25,284 in 6,388 households. The following census in 2011 counted 27,696 people in 7,962 households. At the latest census in 2016, the district had 27,838 inhabitants in 8,694 households.

References 

Tarom County

Districts of Zanjan Province

Populated places in Zanjan Province

Populated places in Tarom County